Lewis is a town in Essex County, Vermont, United States. The town was named for landholders Nathan, Sevignior, and Timothy Lewis. Although incorporated by the state, the town was never formally organized, since it never gained a sufficiently large permanent population. For most of the 20th century, the town had a total population of zero. It reported a population of 2 at the 2020 census; however it is possible due to the town sharing a census block with nearby towns and gores and the introduction of differential privacy in for the 2020 census, that the actual population remained at 0. Indeed, 100% of the town's land that is not federally protected is owned by a single logging company, Weyerhaeuser. The town's affairs are handled by the Unified Towns & Gores Of Essex County.

Geography

Demographics

References

External links
 Lewis, Vermont, New England USA

Towns in Vermont
Towns in Essex County, Vermont